Ioan Tătăran (born 17 October 1961) is a former Romanian footballer who played as a defender. After he ended his playing career he worked as a manager at teams from the Romanian lower leagues.

Honours
FC Baia Mare
Divizia B: 1982–83
Cupa României runner-up: 1981–82
Steaua București
Divizia A: 1984–85
Cupa României: 1984–85, runner-up 1983–84
Unirea Dej
Divizia C: 1993–94

Notes

References

1961 births
Living people
Romanian footballers
Romania under-21 international footballers
Association football defenders
Liga I players
Liga II players
Liga III players
CS Minaur Baia Mare (football) players
FC Steaua București players
ACF Gloria Bistrița players
FCV Farul Constanța players
Romanian football managers
CS Minaur Baia Mare (football) managers
Sportspeople from Baia Mare
FC Unirea Dej players
FC Unirea Dej managers